Mitchell Leon Butler (born December 15, 1970) is an American sports agent and former professional basketball player. He played in the National Basketball Association (NBA) from 1993 to 2004.

The 6' 5" (1.96 m) shooting guard signed undrafted with the Washington Bullets in 1993 after a collegiate career at UCLA in which he played in more career games than any other Bruin and swiped the seventh-most steals in UCLA history. After three seasons in Washington, Butler was traded to the Portland Trail Blazers along with Rasheed Wallace in exchange for Rod Strickland and Harvey Grant. Following his stint playing for the Blazers, he signed as a free agent with the Cleveland Cavaliers. Following the 1999 season, Butler did not play in the NBA for two years. In 2001–02, Butler signed with the Trail Blazers, marking his second stint with the franchise. Mitchell's last year in the league was in the 2003–04 season, when he once again played for the D.C. franchise, now renamed the Washington Wizards. Butler played in a total of 362 NBA games with 33 starts. He owns career averages of 5.2 points, 2 rebounds, and 1 assist.

Butler appeared in the 1994 movie Blue Chips.

Butler worked as NBA sports agent with Lagardère Unlimited before joining Rival Sports Group as president of basketball.

References

External links
 
Mitchell Butler NBA statistics, basketballreference.com

1970 births
Living people
American expatriate basketball people in Lithuania
American men's basketball players
American sports agents
Basketball players from Los Angeles
BC Žalgiris players
Cleveland Cavaliers players
McDonald's High School All-Americans
Parade High School All-Americans (boys' basketball)
Portland Trail Blazers players
San Diego Wildfire players
Shooting guards
UCLA Bruins men's basketball players
Undrafted National Basketball Association players
Washington Bullets players
Washington Wizards players
Yakima Sun Kings players